Qassab Mahalleh (also Romanized as Qaşşāb Maḩalleh) is a village in Jirdeh Rural District, in the Central District of Shaft County, Gilan Province, Iran. At the 2006 census, its population was 197, in 45 families.

References 

Populated places in Shaft County